The Southern California Linux Expo (SCALE) is an annual Linux, open source and free software conference held in Los Angeles, California, since 2002. Despite having Linux in its name, SCALE covers all open source operating systems and software. It is a volunteer-run event.

The event features an expo floor with both commercial and non-profit exhibitors, as well as 4 days of seminars on the topic of Linux and Open Source software. Sessions and presentations cover a broad spectrum of topics and technical levels.

SCALE grew out of a series of LUGFests put on by the Simi Conejo Linux Users Group in the late 90s.   There were four of them, held every 6 months at the Nortel development facility in Simi Valley, California. They ended when Nortel closed that facility in 2001.  Subsequently, members from SCLUG, USCLUG and UCLALUG organized to create a more regional event, which they named the Southern California Linux Expo.

Companies, organizations and projects represented at SCALE include Linux-based projects such as Debian, Gentoo Linux, the Fedora Project, KDE and GNOME, other open-source operating systems including NetBSD and FreeBSD, software projects such as Django, open-source database systems such as MySQL and PostgreSQL, other open-source applications such as Drupal, Inkscape, MythTV and The Document Foundation, activist organizations such as Software Freedom Law Center and the Electronic Frontier Foundation, major technology companies such as IBM, HP and Sharp, web companies including Google, Facebook and eHarmony, and internet projects including OpenStreetMap.

Locations and dates

External links 

 Southern California Linux Expo - Official Website
 Interview: Organizing SCALE with Free Software
 Interview with SCALE organizers
 Gaining Ground and Growing: SCALE 9x
 SCALE 9X Across the Snowy Horizon

Linux conferences
Linux user groups
Free-software events
Recurring events established in 2002
2002 establishments in California